Walter Hume may refer to:
 Walter Reginald Hume, Australian inventor and industrialist 
 Walter Cunningham Hume, British surveyor